Sir Thomas Grosvenor, 5th Baronet (1693 – February 1732 or 1733) was an English Member of Parliament and an ancestor of the modern day Dukes of Westminster.

Thomas Grosvenor was the second surviving son of Sir Thomas Grosvenor, 3rd Baronet.  His two oldest brothers had died young. and his elder surviving brother Richard became the 4th Baronet.

In 1727 Richard and Thomas won the two parliamentary seats for the city of Chester.

Thomas succeeded to the baronetcy when Richard died in July 1732. However, by that time he was already very ill with tuberculosis himself and, having been advised to travel to Italy, died in Naples in the following February. Having no children, he was succeeded by his younger brother Robert.

References 

1693 births
1733 deaths
Baronets in the Baronetage of England
British MPs 1727–1734
Members of the Parliament of Great Britain for English constituencies
Thomas Grosvenor, 5th Baronet